Miloš Stanojević (Serbian Cyrillic: Милош Станојевић; born 20 November 1993) is a Serbian professional footballer who plays as a midfielder for Kazakhstani club Caspiy.

International career
Stanojević made his international debut for the Serbian B team in a friendly 3–0 loss to Qatar.

Career statistics

Club

Honours
Sarajevo
Bosnian Premier League: 2018–19
Bosnian Cup: 2018–19

References

External links
 
 
 Miloš Stanojević stats at Utakmica.rs

1993 births
Living people
Sportspeople from Valjevo
Serbian footballers
Serbian First League players
Serbian SuperLiga players
Premier League of Bosnia and Herzegovina players
Süper Lig players
TFF First League players
FK Radnički Obrenovac players
FK Srem Jakovo players
FK Rad players
FK BASK players
FK Napredak Kruševac players
FK Mladost Lučani players
FK Radnički Niš players
FK Sarajevo players
MKE Ankaragücü footballers
Ankaraspor footballers
FC Caspiy players
Serbia international footballers
Association football midfielders
Serbian expatriate footballers
Expatriate footballers in Bosnia and Herzegovina
Expatriate footballers in Turkey
Expatriate footballers in Kazakhstan